Fort Snelling station is a light rail station on the Blue Line in the Minneapolis–Saint Paul region of the U.S. state of Minnesota, named after the nearby Fort Snelling historic fort structure. This station is located on Minnehaha Avenue, adjacent to the Bishop Henry Whipple Federal Building and diagonally across from a U.S. Army Reserve campus and the main entrance to an Air National Guard station. The station's layout has a center-platform design. Service began at this station when the Blue Line opened on June 26, 2004. At that time, this was the southern terminus of the Blue Line. The remainder of the line, south of this station, opened on December 4, 2004. 

This station is the site of a large park and ride facility. There are two parking lots, making a total of about 975 spaces available to commuters. 

Just north of this station the Blue Line crosses the interchange of Minnesota State Highway 55 and Minnesota State Highway 62 on a flyover. Just south of this station, the line has a third track in the center which was used primarily for the LRVs to switch tracks when this station was the terminus of the line.

Notable places nearby
 Bishop Henry Whipple Federal ("GSA") Building
 Fort Snelling historic fortification
 Fort Snelling State Park
 Campuses/facilities for the Minnesota Air National Guard; the Army Reserve, the Air Force Reserve, and the Navy/Marine Corps/Coast Guard Reserve.
 Fort Snelling North Park & Ride Lot
 Fort Snelling South Park & Ride Lot

References

External links 
Metro Transit: Fort Snelling Station

Railway stations in the United States opened in 2004
2004 establishments in Minnesota
Metro Blue Line (Minnesota) stations in Hennepin County, Minnesota